The 2014 CSU–Pueblo ThunderWolves football team represented Colorado State University–Pueblo in the 2014 NCAA Division II football season. They were led by seventh-year head coach John Wristen and played their home games at Neta and Eddie DeRose ThunderBowl. They were a member of the Rocky Mountain Athletic Conference.

Schedule

Source:

Ranking movements

References

CSU–Pueblo
CSU Pueblo ThunderWolves football seasons
NCAA Division II Football Champions
Rocky Mountain Athletic Conference football champion seasons
CSU–Pueblo ThunderWolves football